Ceratopos is a genus of flies in the family Dolichopodidae, known from Algeria and Portugal. It contains only one species, Ceratopos seguyi. It is closely related to Syntormon, and is considered a junior synonym of it according to Evenhuis & Bickel (2022).

References 

Dolichopodidae genera
Sympycninae
Diptera of Europe
Diptera of Africa
Insects of North Africa
Monotypic Diptera genera